Roisman is a surname. Notable people with the surname include:

 Elad L. Roisman, American lawyer
 Florence Roisman, American legal scholar
 Lois Roisman (1938–2008), American philanthropist, playwright, and poet

See also
 Groisman
 Raisman